The 2012–13 ISU Grand Prix of Figure Skating was a series of senior international figure skating competitions in the 2012–13 season. Skaters competed in the disciplines of men's singles, ladies' singles, pair skating, and ice dancing. Skaters earned points based on their placement at each event and the top six in each discipline qualified to compete at the Grand Prix Final, held in Sochi, Russia.

Organized by the International Skating Union, the Grand Prix series ran from October 13 – December 9, 2012. Skaters competed for medals, prize money, and a chance to compete in the Grand Prix Final. The series set the stage for the 2013 European, Four Continents, and World Championships, as well as each country's national championships.

The corresponding series for junior-level skaters was the 2012–13 ISU Junior Grand Prix.

Schedule 
The ISU announced the following schedule of events taking place in autumn 2012:

Rule changes 
Between seasons, the ISU eliminated the option for seeded skaters to compete at a third GP event and the option for pairs to compete in both the senior Grand Prix and Junior Grand Prix in the same season.

General requirements
Skaters who reached the age of 14 by July 1, 2012 were eligible to compete on the senior Grand Prix circuit.

Prior to competing in a Grand Prix event, skaters were required to have earned the following scores:

Assignments
The International Skating Union released the initial list of Grand Prix assignments on May 21, 2012: Due to the 2012 China anti-Japanese demonstrations, the Japan Skating Federation said it might withdraw its competitors from the Cup of China if the organizers did not provide security guarantees. The event was held without incident.

Men

Ladies

Pairs

Ice dancing

Changes to preliminary assignments
Changes to the initial assignments:

Skate America
 Evan Lysacek withdrew due to injury; Armin Mahbanoozadeh replaced him.

Skate Canada International
 Mary Beth Marley / Rockne Brubaker withdrew due to split.
 Katarina Gerboldt / Alexander Enbert withdrew due to Gerboldt's injury.

Cup of China
 Samuel Contesti withdrew due to retirement, replaced by Sergei Voronov.
 Carolina Kostner withdrew due to insufficient fitness.
 Miki Ando withdrew because she was unable to find a permanent coach.
 Wenjing Sui / Cong Han withdrew due to Sui's injury.
 Narumi Takahashi / Mervin Tran withdrew because she required surgery on a repeatedly dislocating left shoulder.
 Caitlin Yankowskas / Joshua Reagan withdrew due to Reagan's rib injury.

Rostelecom Cup
 Alexandra Nazarova / Maxim Nikitin withdrew and were replaced by Nicole Orford / Thomas Williams
 Mari Vartmann / Aaron Van Cleave withdrew after she broke his cheekbone during a twist lift.
 Johnny Weir withdrew in competition due to right hip injury

Trophée Éric Bompard
 Samuel Contesti withdrew due to retirement, replaced by Jinlin Guan.
 Carolina Kostner withdrew due to insufficient fitness.
 Miki Ando withdrew because she was unable to find a permanent coach.
 Johnny Weir withdrew due to right hip injury
 Aliona Savchenko / Robin Szolkowy withdrew due to Savchenko's severe sinus infection.

NHK Trophy
 Mary Beth Marley / Rockne Brubaker withdrew due to split.
 Wenjing Sui / Cong Han withdrew due to Sui's injury.
 Narumi Takahashi / Mervin Tran withdrew because she required surgery on a repeatedly dislocating left shoulder.
 Caitlin Yankowskas / Joshua Reagan withdrew due to Reagan's rib injury. Replaced by Alexa Scimeca / Chris Knierim.
 Anastasia Martiusheva / Alexei Rogonov and Nicole Della Monica / Matteo Guarise replaced withdrawals in the pairs event.
 Polina Shelepen withdrew due to worsening of a long-standing ankle injury. 
 Alissa Czisny withdrew in order to continue her recovery from surgery and was replaced by Mirai Nagasu.
 Mari Vartmann / Aaron Van Cleave withdrew due to Van Cleave's broken cheekbone.

Medal summary

Top Grand Prix scores 
Skaters ranked according to total score. The short and free columns break down the total score of a skater's best overall event into the short and free program.

Top senior Grand Prix scores after all 7 events: Skate America, Skate Canada, Cup of China, Rostelecom Cup, Trophée Eric Bompard, NHK Trophy, and Grand Prix Final.

Men

Ladies

Pairs

Ice dancing

Prize money and Grand Prix Final qualification points 
The top finishers will earn prize money, as well as points toward qualifying for the Grand Prix Final, according to the chart below.

After the final event, the 2012 NHK Trophy, the six skaters/teams with the most points advanced to the Grand Prix Final. If a skater or team competed at three events, their two best results counted toward the standings. There were seven tie-breakers:
Highest placement at an event. If a skater placed 1st and 3rd, the tiebreaker was the 1st place, and that beats a skater who placed 2nd in both events.
Highest combined total scores in both events. If a skater earned 200 points at one event and 250 at a second, that skater would win in the second tie-break over a skater who earned 200 points at one event and 150 at another.
Participated in two events.
Highest combined scores in the free skating/free dancing portion of both events.
Highest individual score in the free skating/free dancing portion from one event.
Highest combined scores in the short program/original dance of both events.
Highest number of total participants at the events.

If there is still a tie, the tie is considered unbreakable and the tied skaters would all qualify for the Grand Prix Final.

Qualification standings
Bold denotes Grand Prix Final qualification.

Medal standings

References

External links 
Entries/Results:
 Skate America
 Skate Canada
 Cup of China
 Rostelecom Cup
 Trophée Eric Bompard
 NHK Trophy
 Grand Prix FinalStandings''': 
 Men
 Ladies
 Pairs
 Ice dance

Isu Grand Prix Of Figure Skating, 2012-13
ISU Grand Prix of Figure Skating